Nimbochromis fuscotaeniatus (spothead hap, fuscotaeniatus hap) is a species of cichlid endemic to Lake Malawi and Lake Malombe.  Males of this species can reach a length of  TL while the females grow to  TL.  It can also be found in the aquarium trade. It is an ambush predator and feeds on smaller cichlids. Females are smaller than males and a brownish color, while males are larger and blue in color. The species is a mouthbrooder that spawns readily in the aquarium.

See also
List of freshwater aquarium fish species

References

fuscotaeniatus
Fish of Lake Malawi
Fish of Malawi
Fish described in 1922
Taxonomy articles created by Polbot